Agglomeration may refer to:
 Urban agglomeration, in standard English
 Megalopolis, in Chinese English, as defined in China's Standard for basic terminology of urban planning (GB/T 50280—98). Also known as "city cluster".
 Economies of agglomeration, an economic principle regarding geographic concentration of industries
 A subcategory of Flocculation
 Agglomeration, a term used by philosopher Bernard Williams
 oil agglomeration